Erica Jen (Chinese: 任峻瑞; Rén Jùnrùi, born circa 1952) is an American applied mathematician. She was a researcher at Los Alamos National Laboratory, a faculty member at the University of Southern California, and a scientific director and faculty member at the Santa Fe Institute.

Jen's research is based on the mathematical analysis of chaotic and complex behavior. Research areas have included the singular integral equations for crack propagation, the mathematics of cellular automata - a class of dynamical systems that evolve according to simple local interaction rules - and mechanisms of robustness in natural and social systems.

Early life and education
Jen was born in 1952 to Chih-Kung Jen, a Chinese-born physicist who played a leading role in the 1970s in reestablishing scientific exchanges between the U.S. and China. After her junior year at Yale University, Jen went to Beijing University for further education. She became the first American national to be allowed to study in China since 1949 and the first foreigner since the Cultural Revolution

After returning to the U.S., Jen obtained a Ph.D. in applied mathematics from SUNY at Stony Brook and was the first postdoctoral fellow at the Center for Nonlinear Studies at Los Alamos National Laboratory.

Career
Jen served for the period 1983-86 as a university scholar and assistant professor of mathematics at the University of Southern California. In 1986, Jen became a staff member in the theoretical division and acting deputy director of the Center for Nonlinear Studies at Los Alamos National Laboratory.

In 1995, Jen joined the Santa Fe Institute, a leading interdisciplinary research center for the study of complex adaptive systems. She first served as vice president for academic affairs and then as a research professor. Jen was the principal investigator for innovative programs in evolutionary dynamics, social networks, and distributed learning. During her tenure at the Santa Fe Institute, Jen developed the groundbreaking SFI program on the robustness of physical, biological, ecological, and social systems. After 2003, Jen served as external faculty, science board member, and now science board fellow at the Santa Fe Institute. Jen was an editor of Physica D: Nonlinearity, and is also the developer of the Nonlinear Sciences nlin arXive.

Selected bibliography
Daily Life:  An Experience with Peking Youth in The China Difference (1979), Ross Terrill, ed., New York: Harper & Row
D. Campbell, J. P. Crutchfield, J. D. Farmer, and E. Jen. Experimental Mathematics: The Role of Computation in Nonlinear Science. Comm. ACM 28 1985: 374
1989 Lectures on Complex Systems, Erica Jen (ed.), Santa Fe Institute Studies in the Sciences of Complexity, Addison-Wesley, 1989
Global properties of cellular automata, J. Statistical Physics, vol 43, p 219-242 (1986).
Scaling of preimages in cellular automata," Complex Systems 1 (1987) 1045-1062
Exact solvability and quasiperiodicity in one-dimensional cellular automata," Nonlinearity 4 (1991), 251-276
Stable or Robust?  What's the Difference? Complexity 8(3): 12-18 (2003)
Robust Design:  A Repertoire of Biological, Ecological, and Engineering Case Studies, E. Jen (ed), Santa Fe Institute Studies on the Sciences of Complexity, Oxford University Press, 2005

References

20th-century American mathematicians
Peking University alumni
University of Southern California faculty
Los Alamos National Laboratory
Santa Fe Institute people
Yale University alumni
Complex systems scientists
State University of New York
Women mathematicians
1950s births
Living people
21st-century American mathematicians